Brian Redfearn (born 20 February 1935) is a former professional footballer who played for Bradford Park Avenue, Blackburn Rovers, Darlington, Halifax Town, Bradford City and non-League Buxton. He is the father of footballer Neil Redfearn. In 1964 Redfearn was forced to retire from professional football due to an ankle injury.

Playing career

Bradford Park Avenue
Brian Redfearn began his career at Bradford Park Avenue in 1952. He played a total of 130 games for the other team in Bradford and scored 32 goals. In 1958 he transferred to Blackburn Rovers but Park Avenue refused to pay him his £500 compensation so Blackburn ended up paying him the £500. 45 years later, his son, Neil Redfearn' signed for Park Avenue and played his 1,000th career game for them.

Blackburn Rovers
Despite being on Blackburn's books for a year from December 1957, Redfearn never played a game for Blackburn and transferred to Darlington in 1959.

Darlington
Redfearn played 49 games for Darlington and he scored 15 goals. After a total of two years at Darlington, Redfearn transferred to Halifax Town in June 1961 following his relatively successful spell for 'The Darlings'.

Halifax Town
Redfearn played 67 games and scored 10 goals between 1961 and 1963. His son, Neil Redfearn, was to play and be in caretaker charge (twice) or Halifax Town 40 years later in 2001 and 2002. In 1963 Redfearn transferred to Bradford City.

Bradford City
Redfearn played 7 games and scored 2 goals. He retired from professional football and signed for non-league Buxton in 1964. His son, Neil Redfearn, played for Bradford City between 1999 and 2000.

External links
 

1935 births
Living people
English footballers
Association football midfielders
Bradford (Park Avenue) A.F.C. players
Blackburn Rovers F.C. players
Darlington F.C. players
Halifax Town A.F.C. players
Bradford City A.F.C. players
Buxton F.C. players
English Football League players